Magiagi is a village on the island of Upolu in Samoa. It is situated on the central north coast of the island. The village is in the political district of Tuamasaga.

The population is 1,759.

References

Populated places in Tuamasaga